Duveneck may refer to:

 Duveneck, Wisconsin, US
 Frank Duveneck (1848–1919), American painter